The Baranya County Council is the local legislative body of Baranya County in South-West Hungary. After the elections in 2019, it consists 18 councillors, and is controlled by the Fidesz which has 12 councillors, versus 2 Jobbik, 2 Democratic Coalition, 1 MSZP and 1 Momentum Movement councillors.

Latest election

Council history

References 

Local government in Hungary
Baranya County